The men's artistic skating free skating at the 2019 Pan American Games in Lima, Peru was held between July 26–27 at the Polideportivo 3.

Results
8 athletes from 8 countries competed.

Short Program source: Long Program source:

References

Roller sports at the 2019 Pan American Games